Satpur Kamil Madrasah is an educational institution situated in Lamakazi at  Bishwanath upazila, Sylhet. The madrasah is run under "Alia madrasah" curriculum up to kamil level (M.A. equivalent). In 2017,  Honours course was started besides regular curriculum under the affiliation of “Islamic Arabic University“,Dhaka.  Among the 4.38 acres of total registered land only 1.65 acres are used as main academic area of the madrasah with current number of students being  over 1500. A reconstruction project of the age-old educational building starting in 2016, has recently come to an end.

History 
The madrasa was founded by a wali known as Ghulam Husayn Satpuri in his own home in 1948. Ghulam Husayn was a murid of Pir Hamidullah of Qaimganj. After Hamidullah's death, Husayn pledged bay'ah to Abdul Latif Chowdhury Fultali. The first conference was held after Husayn returned from Hajj, and had Harmuzullah Sayda as the guest of honour. The site of the madrasa was later changed to the local eidgah.  The madrasah started as an Ebtedai (primary) level institution but gradually Dakhil, Alim, Fazil and Kamil levels were recognised  by the Madrsah Board accordingly in 1958, 1960, 1962 & 1965. Under the affiliation of "Islamic Arbic university,Dhaka" Honors course in "Al hadis & Islamic studies " was started in 2017.

See also 
 Bangladesh Madrasah Education Board
 Education in Bangladesh
 Saheb Qiblah Fultali Rh.

References 

Education in Sylhet District
Madrasas in Bangladesh
Educational institutions established in 1948
Alia madrasas of Bangladesh
1948 establishments in East Pakistan